Esteban Rossi-Hansberg (born July 16, 1973) is a Mexican-American economist currently the Glen A. Lloyd Distinguished Service Professor in the Kenneth C. Griffin Department of Economics at the University of Chicago. Until June 2021, he was the Theodore A. Wells '29 Professor of Economics at Princeton University. He performs research in macroeconomics, international trade, and urban and regional economics. His research focuses on the internal structure of cities, the distribution of economic activity in space, economic growth and the size distribution of cities, the effect of offshoring on wage inequality, the role of information technology on wages and organization, and firm dynamics and the size distribution of firms. Rossi-Hansberg was also a faculty member in the Economics Department at Stanford University. He is a research fellow in the NBER and the CEPR, and a Fellow of the Econometric Society since 2017.

References

External links

Princeton University faculty
Stanford University Department of Economics faculty
University of Chicago alumni
Instituto Tecnológico Autónomo de México alumni
1973 births
Living people
American people of Mexican descent
Fellows of the Econometric Society
21st-century American economists
Journal of Political Economy editors